Alginase II may refer to:

 Poly(beta-D-mannuronate) lyase, an enzyme
 Poly(alpha-L-guluronate) lyase, an enzyme